The 1985 Star World Championships were held in Nassau, Bahamas in 1985.

Results

References

External links
 

Star World Championships
1985 in sailing
Sailing competitions in the Bahamas